Bang the Drum may refer to:

 Bang the Drum (band), a 1989–1991 Australian pop rock group
 Bang the Drum (album), by Mango Groove, 2009
 Bang the Drum EP, by INXS, 2004
 "Bang the Drum", a song by Bryan Adams and Nelly Furtado from the 2010 Winter Olympics opening ceremony

See also
 
 "Bang a Drum", a 1990 song by Jon Bon Jovi